KWCD (92.3 FM) is a radio station  broadcasting a Country Western format. It is licensed to Bisbee, Arizona, United States. This station serves southern Cochise County, Arizona and a small piece of northern Sonora, Mexico. The station is currently owned by Townsquare Media.

History
This station went on the air using the call letters KBAZ (meaning: Bisbee AriZona) on October 12, 1979. This station was the second FM radio station in southern Cochise County AZ. In 1982, under new ownership, this station rebranded itself, changed its call letters to KZMK (meaning: cosmic) and was called "The Starship". For several months prior to the change billboards appeared around Cochise County featuring a flying saucer with the words "the starship is coming", leaving people to wonder what the billboards meant.  Just prior to the change, the call letters and the frequency were added to the billboards as well as the wording was changed to "the starship is here".

KZMK entered into direct competition with KTAZ-FM, which was at the time the number 1 rock and roll station in the area. KZMK broadcasts with considerably less power than its rival KTAZ, (55 watts -vs- 3000 watts) and was called by broadcasters "the 50 watt blowtorch", however KZMK's signal covers a greater area, to include all of the populated areas in southern Cochise County as well as parts of northern Cochise County and parts of northern Sonora, Mexico because its transmitter is located on a mountain peak, at an approximate elevation of 7,000 feet above sea level.  Ironically both stations are now owned by the same company

On September 1, 1993, the station changed its call letters to the current KWCD, and changed its format to Country Western. The call letters KZMK were assumed by its old rival KTAZ-FM. The station's power was later increased to 90 watts.

History of ownership
1979–1982  Wrye and Associates

1982–1996  Copper Valley Broadcasting

1996–2000  DB Broadcasting

2000–2003  Commonwealth Broadcasting

2003–present  Cherry Creek Media

References

External links
 

Country radio stations in the United States
WCD
Townsquare Media radio stations